Burks may refer to:

Burks (surname)
Burks House (disambiguation)
Ellis Burks Field, Ranger, Texas, USA; a baseball facility
Burks' Distillery (" Burks' "), Loretto, Kentucky, USA; a distillery facility, former whiskey distiller, and NRHP-listed building
Burks v. United States (" Burks "), a 1978 U.S. Supreme Court case that clarified the scope of double jeopardy under the 5th Amendment

See also

 Antonio Burks (disambiguation)
 Justice Burks (disambiguation) or Judge Burks
 
 
 Burk (disambiguation)
 Berks (disambiguation)
 Birks (disambiguation)